Javier Pérez (born 16 May 1977) is a Spanish football coach.

Coaching career 
He was a youth coach with Real Madrid's youth teams from U9-U19 teams.

In 2012, he began working with the United States Soccer Federation, serving as head coach with the United States U18 team and an assistant with the United States U20 team. In 2014, he became an assistant for the United States senior team under Jürgen Klinsmann

In December 2015, he was named assistant coach of New York City FC of Major League Soccer under Patrick Vieira, remaining with the club after Vieria's departure under Domènec Torrent .

In 2021, he joined Toronto FC as an assistant under new coach Chris Armas. On 4 July, he was named interim coach for Toronto, following the firing of Armas. On 7 July, in his debut as head coach, Toronto defeated the New England Revolution by a score of 3–2. On 9 August, he was officially named the head coach for the remainder of the season, removing the interim title. He departed the club at the end of the season.

Personal
Pérez holds a UEFA Pro Licence, UEFA's highest coaching certificate, from the Royal Spanish Football Federation and a UEFA A Licence from the English Football Association. He also has a Ph.D. in Sports Science from Universidad De León (University of León) in Spain. Pérez speaks Spanish, English, French and German.

Pérez wrote the U.S. Soccer Coaching Curriculum with Claudio Reyna.

Coaching statistics

References

External links 

Living people
Spanish football managers
New York City FC non-playing staff
Spanish expatriate football managers
Spanish expatriate sportspeople in the United States
Expatriate soccer managers in the United States
Toronto FC non-playing staff
Toronto FC coaches
Real Madrid CF non-playing staff
1977 births
United States men's national soccer team non-playing staff